Luke A. Nichter is an American historian and professor at Texas A&M University. In 2009, he filed a court case which resulted in the declassification of most of the records concerning U.S. v. Liddy, the Watergate break-ins case.

Works

References

Living people
21st-century American historians
21st-century American male writers
Texas A&M University faculty
Historians of the United States
Year of birth missing (living people)
Historians from Texas
American male non-fiction writers